Philip of Cleves (1459 in Le Quesnoy – 28 January 1528 in Wijnendale Castle), Lord of Ravenstein, Wijnendale and Enghien, was a nobleman from the Low Countries and army commander, first for Maximilian of Austria, then for Flemish rebels and the kingdom of France.

Biography

Background
He was the son of Adolph of Cleves, Lord of Ravenstein (1425–1492, great-grandson of the Duke of Burgundy John the Fearless) and Beatrix of Portugal (died 1462, daughter of Peter of Portugal). Philip grew up together with Mary of Burgundy because his father remarried Anne of Burgundy, aunt and governess of Mary of Burgundy.
Philippe Monsieur, as he was called, married in 1485 Francisca of Luxembourg, daughter of Peter II, Count of Saint-Pol, Lord of Enghien. The marriage remained childless.

Career
In 1477, Philip of Cleves became military commander in French Flanders and fought against the French. 
In the battle of Battle of Guinegate (1479), he was entrusted with leading the cavalry (Nassau led the infantry) to guard the crossing of the river Lys. Philip had an overly eager horse that pushed him ahead of his man in an uncontrolled manner. Maximilian himself witnessed Philip fought and fell right in front of his eyes and thought he was dead, but Philip and his horse in fact survived relatively undamaged. After this, Philip and a small band of Burgundian troops was chased by one hundred Frenchmen for 9 km until reaching Aire. According to Molinet, the French troops, seeing the young rider "dressed in a manteline of golden cloth, rich and elegant", riding a magnificent horse, thought that it was Maximilian himself. He did not return until the next day (later he explained that he had to persuade people who thought the battle was lost), when Maximilian was in a jubilated mood after the victory and did not give the slightest reproach, only delighted by the fact that his right-hand man (who was also his wife's relative) was still alive. Years later though, when the relationship between the two men worsened due to later events during the tumultuous regency of Maximilian, this event would trouble Philip again.

In 1482 he restored order in the Prince-Bishopric of Liège, after the murder of Bishop Louis de Bourbon, Bishop of Liège by William I de La Marck.

When Maximilian of Austria was called to Germany in 1486 to arrange the succession of his father Frederick III, Philip of Cleves took over the government of the Netherlands, together with Engelbert II of Nassau and chancellor Jean Carondelet. He was also Admiral of Flanders between 1485 and 1488.

After the return of Maximilian, Philip actively participated in the suppression of the revolt of the Flemish cities (Ypres, Bruges and Ghent). When Maximilian was taken prisoner in Bruges, Philip volunteered to take his place as hostage, so that Maximilian could be released on May 16, 1488, under the condition of granting more freedom to the cities. But, once released, Maximilian refused to honour the agreement. Deeply hurt by the betrayal of his Lord, Philip joined the rebellious cities and became their military commander. He tried to conclude an alliance with King Charles VIII of France, but received little military support. Other attempts to ally with the Dutch Hooks, Brabant or Liège led to nothing. He was forced to surrender his last stronghold, Sluis, on 12 October 1492. In his allegory the Weisskunig, Maximilian would later claim that the "blue king" bought Philip away; Koenigsberger argues that the Cleves family had "hovered for years" in its loyalties and Philip's switching sides "cannot therefore have come as a complete surprise to his contemporaries".

After the revolt, Philip accompanied King Louis XII of France in his Italian invasion, and became Viceroy of Genoa. According to Hans Cools, his career as a governor was not successful. After a few years, he was allowed to return to the Netherlands and lived in the Castle of Enghien, until his wife died in 1523 and the castle was inherited by her sister Marie of Luxembourg, Countess of Vendôme. Philip lived the last five years of his life in the Wijnendale Castle.

Despite the efforts of his friend Charles I de Lalaing and his own efforts to explain his previous behaviours (including the Guinegate incident), Philip was never allowed into the Order of the Golden Fleece. Reportedly, Maximilian threatened to return his own collar if Philip was accepted.

References

House of La Marck
Belgian nobility
1459 births
1528 deaths
Lords of Ravenstein
Deaths in Belgium
People from Le Quesnoy